Never Never River, a perennial stream of the Bellinger River catchment, is located in the Mid North Coast region of New South Wales, Australia.

Course and features
Never Never River rises on the eastern slopes of the Dorrigo Plateau, near Tallowood Point, east northeast of Dorrigo within the Dorrigo National Park, and flows generally southeast and southwest, before reaching its confluence with the Bellinger River, near Gordonville, northwest of Bellingen. The river descends  over its  course.

See also

 List of rivers of Australia

References

Rivers of New South Wales
Mid North Coast